Brontë is a crater on Mercury. Its name was adopted by the International Astronomical Union in 1976. Bronte is named for English writers Charlotte Brontë, who lived from 1816 to 1855, Emily Brontë, who lived from 1818 to 1848, and Anne Brontë, who lived from 1820 to 1849, and English writer and artist Branwell Brontë, who lived from 1817 to 1848.

Brontë forms a crater pair with Degas immediately to the south.  Brontë is covered with ejecta and secondary craters from the much younger Degas.  Both craters lie within Sobkou Planitia.

References

Impact craters on Mercury
Brontë family